Suzanne Jane Dando, BEM (born 3 July 1961 in Balham, London) is a British former Olympic gymnast, who competed at the 1979 World Gymnastics Championship in Fort Worth, Dallas and the 1980 Summer Olympics in Moscow. Since her retirement, she has worked as a television broadcaster for a number of channels, including BBC1, BBC2, Channel 4 and Sky Sports and serves as a patron and trustee of a number of charities.

Early life
Suzanne Dando was born in Balham, London and spent her early years in Merstham Surrey. Aged 6, her parents moved to Uckfield, Sussex where she spent her childhood. Suzanne has one sister. She studied at Uckfield Comprehensive and Catford Girls School.

British and Olympic gymnast
Her gymnastics talent was first recognised at age eleven by her school physical education teacher Anne Billingham. She quickly passed all the BAGA awards and climbed onto the uneven bars for the first time when she was 12. In 1975 she had to leave her family home in Sussex and move to London to further her gymnastics career. She first represented her country at international level in 1976 aged just 15 when she competed for Britain against West Germany. After winning many National titles, in 1977 she was awarded a Sir Winston Churchill Scholarship Churchill Fellowship allowing her to spend time training in the US in 1978. She returned to the US in early 1979, returning home in time to compete in the British Championships. Unfortunately she sustained an injury and could not compete, which then ruled her out of the squad for the 1979 European Championships. On recovery, she went on to represent her country in the more competitive arena of the 1979 World Championships, Fort Worth, Dallas USA, gaining her F.I.G. Gold Pin.

In 1980, Dando won the 'Champion of Champions' title at the Royal Albert Hall. In May she became the Overall British National Champion. She led her teammates, Susan Cheesborough and Denise Jones, to the 1980 Olympics in Moscow. Dando improved dramatically on her standing (48th) following prelims, finishing 27th in the AA competition.

Retirement
Like many gymnasts, Dando retired after the Olympics, explaining that the direction the sport was taking concerned her, as the serious injuries, like Yelena Mukhina's, were increasing. Dando later revealed to the UK press that she had suffered anorexia whilst a gymnast. At one point, her parents and coaches reduced her training until she regained her strength and started eating properly.

After gymnastics
Following her retirement, Dando coached the under fives in gymnastics at the Lewisham Leisure Centre in South London. She wrote a book, "Fun Ways to Looking Good", and produced and presented her own fitness video, "Flexercise". In the early 1980s, she made several appearances for the Conservative Party, citing Margaret Thatcher as her inspiration.

In 1982 she competed in and became the BBC Superstars Champion.

In 1983, Dando was the gymnastics supervisor for the Bond film, Octopussy. The following year her fitness album, Shape Up and Dance with Suzanne Dando, peaked at No. 87 in the UK Albums Chart.

Dando has had a career in show business, serving as a TV presenter on a variety of shows for BBC, ITV and Channel Four. Dando also worked as a model, actress and singer.

Her TV career started with the BBC presenting the children's programme 'Stopwatch' with Daley Thompson and Janice Long.
She first joined Sky Sports at the end of 1993, mainly live programs on basketball and show jumping, with the odd stint on the BBC for national and international gymnastics events. She presented the BBC2 art programme, 'Awash with Colour,' and BBC's 'The Pet Set'. Most recently co-presenting Horse of Year Show 2009.

Charitable activity

Dando has been an ambassador of The Prince's Trust since 1999 and a patron for Against Breast Cancer since the early 1990s. She has taken part in many of their fundraising events over the years, such as launching the Oxford Bike Ride and more recently the charity's first Breast Walk Ever, a marathon walk throughout Oxfordshire.

A former Honorary Vice-President of The Children's Trust, she raised over £18,000 running the London Marathon in 2008 alongside her husband Adam Reynolds and the Children's Trust former patient, Alfie Russell. In 2011, she teamed up with Russell again when they successfully summited Mount Kilimanjaro, raising another £11,000 for charity.

A passionate supporter of the men and women of Britain's Armed Forces, Suzanne in 2010 coordinated The Remembrance Expedition in support of the Royal British Legion. Following an old wartime escape route, she led a team of women past and present from the Royal Navy, RAF and Army across the Pyrenees, raising £38,000 for the charities' proposed Battle Back Centres.

A former trustee of The Baton charity, founded by friend Alan Rowe MBE, Suzanne in 2013 ran the Baton Relay, a 110-mile team run from RAF Brize Norton though the night to the National Memorial Arboretum (NMA) in Shropshire.

Dando is a lifelong animal lover and has rescued a number of dogs, cats and horses. She currently lends her support to the Dogs Trust and Blue Cross (by sponsoring dogs), as well as her local branch of Riding for The Disabled Association and the World Horse Welfare.

In the 2015 New Year Honours, Suzanne was awarded a British Empire Medal (BEM) for services to charity.

Personal life

In July 1987, Dando married Graham Maclean, a composer and songwriter, in Westminster. However, the marriage broke down. In September 1996 Dando married the Australian actor Bruce Roberts at Uckfield but he returned to Australia alone in the winter of 1998. At the time he said that he hoped their relationship could survive the separation. It did not and the couple divorced. Dando is now married to businessman Adam Reynolds and lives in Oxfordshire.

Competition record
 Lilia-White Championships: 1st UB
 Grade 6 National Champion.
 Grade 4 National Champion.
 British Vault Champion.
 British Beam Champion.
 British Floor Champion.
 GBR-TCH Dual Meet: 4th AA
 GBR-HUN Dual Meet: 5th AA
 GBR Nationals: 3rd AA
 Coca-Cola International v China: 7th AA (tie)
 1979 World Artistic Gymnastics Championships..16th
 1980 British Championship: 1st AA
 1980 Champions Cup: 1st AA
 1980 GBR-HUN Dual Meet: 3rd AA
 1980 Champions All: 6th AA
 1980 Cottbus Intl: 14th AA
 1980 Summer Olympics:27th AA

References

External links
 

1961 births
Living people
People from Wandsworth
British female artistic gymnasts
English television presenters
English businesspeople
Olympic gymnasts of Great Britain
Gymnasts at the 1980 Summer Olympics